The Tomb of the Jibei King is a tomb from the time of the Western Han Dynasty in Changqing District of Jinan, Shandong Province, China. It is also known as the Han Dynasty Tomb of Shuangru Mountain . The tomb is thought to have been the burial site of Liu Kuan, the last king of Jibei who ruled from 97–85 BC during the time of the Emperor Wu of Han of the Western Han Dynasty. The tomb was a major archaeological find since it had been untouched by grave robbers. Its discovery was ranked among the top ten Chinese archaeological finds of 1996 by Chinese National Office for Cultural Artefacts.

The City of Lu (thought to have been located near modern Luchengwa in Jinan City about five kilometers north of the tomb) served as the capital of the Kingdom of Jibei as well as a cultural and economic center during the time of the Han Dynasty. Liu Kuan, the last king of Jibei was forced to commit suicide for having an affair with his widowed step mother and for cursing the emperor during a sacrifice. The tomb of the King of Jibei was carved into a limestone cliff and covered a total area of 1,500 square meters. It was excavated during the years 1995 and 1997 by archaeologists of Shandong University. More than 2000 artifacts – bronze objects, jade objects, lacquer wares, iron artifacts, ceramics, and gold objects were recovered from the site. Among the jade artifacts, a jade mask made of 18 pieces, jade swords, and jade headrests are particularly noteworthy. Gold artifacts include about 20 gold ingots (so-called "gold cakes") as well as pieces belonging to chariots. The discovered artifacts reflect the wealth of the city during this period. If the identification of the tomb as the burial place of Liu Kuan is correct,
he had been granted a royal burial despite his disgrace. However, the jade burial suit which was customary for wealthy aristocrats of the period may have been denied to him as a result.
The artifacts have been relocated to the Museum of Changqing District in the town of Changqing and the Shandong Museum in Jinan.

The tomb has been listed as a monument of the People's Republic of China with resolution number 5–168. The archaeological name of the site is Shuangrushan Han Tomb Number 1 as a second tomb from the same period is located nearby.

Image gallery

See also
 List of sites in Jinan

References

Footnotes

General sources 
 任相宏:《山东长清双乳山一号汉墓出土的钱币》,《中国钱币》1997年第2期.
 山东大学考古系等:《山东长清县双乳山一号汉墓发掘简报》,《考古》1997年第3期. The brief report of Shuang Ru Mountain No.1 Han Grave excavating of Chang Qing in Shan Dong 》 (《Archaeology》,1997).
 任相宏《双乳山一号汉墓墓主考略》，《考古》1997年3期10页
 崔大庸:《长清双乳山西汉济北王陵发掘成果的学术意义》,《山东大学学报》1997年第2期.

External links

 Jade mask
 Providing for the Afterlife: 'Brilliant Artifacts' From Shandong (Chariot fitting—yoke saddle ornament, ejiao)
 ebd. (Gold ingots)
 ebd. (Two pigs)
 The Chinese Devotion to What Comes Next
 Shandong University
 Jade Mask of Prince Jibei of Western Han Dynasty Excavated at Changqing, Shandong Province by Ren Xianghong
 Shuangrushan Han mu
 Shandong Discoveries
 Shuangrushan mizhou 

Archaeological sites in China
Mausoleums in China
Buildings and structures in Shandong
Han dynasty architecture
Major National Historical and Cultural Sites in Shandong